Rutherglen in Lanarkshire was a royal burgh that returned one commissioner to the Parliament of Scotland and to the Convention of Estates.

After the Acts of Union 1707, Rutherglen, Dumbarton, Glasgow and Renfrew formed the Glasgow district of burghs, returning one member between them to the House of Commons of Great Britain.

List of burgh commissioners

 1661, 1665 convention, 1672–74, 1678 convention: David Spens 
 1667 convention: Andrew Pinkerton, bailie 
 1669–70: James Riddell (dismissed for malversation, 1671) 
 1689 convention, 1689–1702: John Scott, maltman  
 1702–07: George Spens, provost

See also
 List of constituencies in the Parliament of Scotland at the time of the Union

References

Constituencies of the Parliament of Scotland (to 1707)
History of South Lanarkshire
Politics of South Lanarkshire
Rutherglen
Constituencies disestablished in 1707
1707 disestablishments in Scotland